WJKD (99.7 FM radio station licensed to Vero Beach, Florida, and serving the Treasure Coast.  It broadcasts a variety hits radio format, carrying the syndicated Jack FM service.  The station is owned by Treasure & Space Coast Radio with the license held by Vero Beach Broadcasters, LLC.

WJKD has an effective radiated power (ERP) of 50,000 watts. The transmitter is on 77th Avenue at 66th Street in Winter Beach, Florida.

History
The station signed on the air on March 27, 1992, as WWDO-FM. From 1995 to 2001, the station carried a country music format, and branded itself as Panther Country 99.7, with the call sign, WPAW.

On March 5, 2001, the station changed to a 1980s hits format. It rebranded itself as 99.7 GNX, to reflect the new call letters WGNX, and its slogan "The Music of Generation X". In 2003, WGNX added a few hits from the 1970s and 1990s to its playlist, making it more like a variety hits station, while still imaging around Generation X.  In 2004, WGNX tried playing alternative rock music on Saturday nights. However, the idea did not go over well, and the station cancelled the show.

In December, 2006, WGNX rebranded itself as 997 Jack FM, and changed its call letters to WJKD. Jack FM's playlist features hit music across multiple genres (mostly pop and rock) from the 1960s to the present day. The slogan, Playing What We Want, promotes Jack FM as having a larger playlist with more variety than most commercial radio stations.

References

External links

JKD
Radio stations established in 1992
1992 establishments in Florida
Jack FM stations
Adult hits radio stations in the United States